The 1890 Partick by-election was a parliamentary by-election held in Scotland on 11 February 1890 for the British House of Commons constituency of Partick. It was caused by the death of the constituency's sitting Liberal Unionist Member of Parliament (MP) Alexander Craig Sellar, who had held the seat since the 1885 general election. He had been elected as a Liberal in 1885, but joined the breakaway Liberal Unionists in 1886, and was re-elected at the election of 1886 as a Liberal Unionist.

Result
The seat was held for the Liberal Unionists by James Parker Smith;

References 

1890 elections in the United Kingdom
1890 in Scotland
1890s elections in Scotland
By-elections to the Parliament of the United Kingdom in Glasgow constituencies
Lanarkshire
1890s in Glasgow